John Jones (born October 19, 1965 in Thunder Bay, Ontario), is a former driver in the CART Championship Car series.  He raced in the 1988, 1989, 1991, and 1992 seasons with 41 career starts, including the 1989 Indianapolis 500.  He finished in the top ten 11 times, including four in 7th position in 1988, when he finished the season in 11th position and was named Rookie of the Year.

John's brother Hunter Jones was also an active driver in the CART Indy Lights championship.

PPG IndyCar World Series

(key) (Races in bold indicate pole position)

See also

List of Canadians in Champ Car

External links
 Driver Database Profile

1965 births
Racing drivers from Ontario
Living people
Champ Car drivers
Indianapolis 500 drivers
Indy Lights drivers
International Formula 3000 drivers
Trans-Am Series drivers

Paul Stewart Racing drivers